Deborah Ann Ryan (born May 13, 1993) is an American actress and singer. She started acting professionally onstage at the age of seven, and was later discovered during Disney Channel's nationwide search for new talent.

Ryan's work for Disney Channel includes starring roles in the series The Suite Life on Deck (2008–2011), the film 16 Wishes (2010), the series Jessie (2011–2015), and the film Radio Rebel (2012). She also appeared in the drama film What If... (2010) and the series Insatiable (2018–2019). She gained prominence in music by contributing vocals to the soundtracks of her Disney projects and later formed the band The Never Ending in 2013, with whom she released the EP One (2014).

Early life
Deborah Ann Ryan was born in Huntsville, Alabama, on May 13, 1993. She has a brother. Her father's job as a civilian consultant to the U.S. military required the family to move to numerous places around Europe, and they lived in Germany until she was 10. She started performing in professional theaters at the age of seven on an American base in Germany. They then returned to the U.S. and settled in Texas. In a 2009 People Magazine interview, Ryan described herself as a "nerd" in school. She was bullied in middle school for being a mascot and a member of the school's chess club.

Career

Ryan began appearing in various television commercials in her early teenage years. In 2006 she made her television debut on the show Barney & Friends. Ryan's first film role was in 2007 as a guest character in Barney: Let's Go to the Firehouse, she played the role of a teenager. She appeared in several commercials for iDog and various board games; she was in an iDog Dance commercial in 2008. Ryan also had a major role in the Metro-Goldwyn-Mayer feature film The Longshots as Edith. Ryan played one of the main characters, Bailey Pickett, on the Disney Channel Original Series, The Suite Life on Deck, which is a sequel to the hit Disney Channel series, The Suite Life of Zack & Cody. The series's pilot aired on September 26, 2008 in the United States and it became the most watched series premiere in Canada on the Family channel. The character is a very intelligent girl who boarded the ship to leave the fictional town of Kettlecorn, Kansas because she hated the fact that the town is so small. The series was 2008's number one top scripted television series for teens, beating the veteran series Hannah Montana and Wizards of Waverly Place in the ratings. The series was also 2009's top rated scripted series, outpacing other teenage shows.

In 2009, Ryan landed a starring role in the independent feature film, What If..., alongside Kevin Sorbo and Kristy Swanson. The film was shot in Grand Rapids and Manistee, Michigan in July 2009 and was released in theaters on August 20, 2010. The film is produced by Pure Flix Entertainment and centers on a Christian family. In October 2009, Ryan hosted the first Tween Girl Summit Music Festival. "Tween girls are drawn to talented performers who emanate the joy of life, and we are so happy to have teen favorite Debby Ryan as the first host of The Tween Summit Music Festival," said Denise Restauri, founder of The Tween Summit, AllyKatzz.com and AK Tweens. Ryan was set to headline the "Terrific Teen Tour", a concert series which co-headlined Mitchel Musso, Jasmine Richards and Savannah Outen, that would start on July 9, 2009 and end on July 14 but the tour was canceled owing to schedule conflicts. The tour would have been Ryan's debut as a live musician. In 2010, she starred in the young adult film 16 Wishes. In addition, the movie introduced Ryan to new audiences, such as the contemporary adult audience since the movie received high viewership in the adults demographic. Ryan noted that to prepare for her role in 16 Wishes, she watched numerous Brat Pack movies.

On March 25, 2011, Ryan starred in The Suite Life Movie, based on the show she had starred in. On March 29, she released the promotional single "Made of Matches", which served as the theme of the Discovery Family show R.L. Stine's The Haunting Hour, in which she starred in one episode. The Suite Life on Deck finished its run on May 6, 2011. On July 6, she released her debut solo single, the alternative hip hop song We Ended Right, featuring Chad Hively & Chase Ryan. The song was released from her own label, the Ryan River Studio, founded with her brother, Chase Ryan. Also in 2011, it was announced that Ryan landed her own Disney Channel series called Jessie, which debuted in September 2011. The show follows a girl who moves from Texas to New York City to become a star but becomes a nanny instead for a family with four children. Jessie is a show she also helped create, relating that she wanted her character to relate to herself. Ryan directed the season three episode "Coffee Talk", making her the youngest female director for a Disney Channel production. Additionally, in a shift towards a more mature role, she guest starred in an episode of the show Private Practice as a recovering drug addict.

On February 17, 2012, Ryan starred in another Disney Channel movie entitled Radio Rebel as Tara, a very shy teenage who dreads speaking to anyone in her school, but in the privacy of her bedroom, she incorporates the most famous radio persona of the internet under the nickname 'Radio Rebel'. She released a cover version of "We Got the Beat", by The Go-Go's, as the promotional single for the film on February 21. On August 31, 2012 she voiced the character Spike in the Tinker Bell film Secret of the Wings. Also in 2012, she formed the indie band The Never Ending with guitarist Kyle Moore and drummer Johnny Franco. She plays several instruments, including the guitar, piano, and keyboard. In 2013, Ryan starred in the film Kristin's Christmas Past as Haddie. She recorded an appearance in the film Muppets Most Wanted, released on March 21, 2014, as Savana, but the scene was deleted. The scene was later reinstated in the Blu-ray release's extended version. On June 1, The Never Ending released their debut single, "Mulholland Drive", with a premiere on the Billboard website. Their debut EP One was released on June 24, featuring album art with a circus-theme. She also appeared in the show TV series Mighty Med as Jade and was guest mentor in the fifth season of Fashion Police. On April 17, 2015, an episode of Girl Meets World premiered featuring Ryan as Aubrey Macavoy. On June 23, 2015, The Never Ending debuted their new single, titled "Secondhand". Later that year, the band toured as an opening act for the North American leg of Fifth Harmony's Reflection Tour.

In 2016, Ryan was cast in the NBC police series The Mysteries of Laura in season two as Lucy Diamond, Laura's drugged and trouble-making younger paternal half-sister and the half-aunt of Nicholas and Harrison. At the same time, Ryan was confirmed in the cast of comedy series Sing It!. The show debuted on May 25, 2016 at YouTube Red, a paid service of streaming original series and movies, similar to Netflix. Ryan played Holli Holiday, a famous and egocentric singer, who uses the fictional talent show Sing It! to self-promote. The character was inspired by Paula Abdul. On August 22, Ryan was confirmed to join the VH1 drama series Daytime Divas, based on the book Satan's Sisters by former The View host Star Jones. The series debuted on June 5, 2017. She will play Maddie Finn, an ex-host of The Lunch Hour and rival of Kibby, who wants to return to the show.

In June 2017, Ryan announced via her Instagram account that Netflix had ordered Insatiable to series, after previously being passed on by The CW. The first season premiered on August 10, 2018. On February 14, 2020, the series was cancelled after two seasons.

In 2020, Ryan starred alongside Alison Brie in the Netflix drama film Horse Girl, which was directed by Jeff Baena. In the same year, Ryan was cast in the Netflix's upcoming thriller film Night Teeth, directed by Adam Randall. She will also appear in The Opening Act directed by Steve Byrne.

Other ventures

Fashion

In July 2012, Ryan started work on a clothing line for 2013. She said she was in the beginning stages of building herself a fashion brand and revealed that she has been looking into designers and interviewing brands she might like to work with.

Personal life
Ryan is a Christian. Due to her father's job with the military leading her family to relocate around Europe during her childhood, she is fluent in German.

Ryan dated Twenty One Pilots drummer Josh Dun from May 2013 to September 2014, and they resumed their relationship at an unknown date. They were married in Austin, Texas, on December 31, 2019.

In March 2015, Ryan revealed that she had once been in an abusive relationship, though she described it as a professional relationship rather than a romantic one. She explained that "it was such emotional manipulation to the point where it became physical", and the experience inspired her to team up with Mary Kay and Love is Respect for their "Don't Look Away" anti-domestic violence campaign.

In April 2016, Ryan was arrested for driving under the influence. She was initially charged with felony DUI, which was later reduced to two misdemeanors, and was released after posting $100,000 bail. On June 30, she pleaded no contest to reckless driving and was sentenced to three years of probation, community service, and attending a DUI program.

Artistry
In a 2009 People interview, Ryan stated that her Suite Life co-star, Brenda Song, is her acting idol. In a March 2009 interview, Ryan revealed she also looks up to Meryl Streep, calling Streep "so profoundly thought-provoking and life-changing". She has said that her other role models include Anne Hathaway, Rachel McAdams, and Tobey Maguire.

Ryan has said that her musical style includes folk, indie pop, and country. She cited The Lumineers, Mumford & Sons, April Smith and the Great Picture Show, and Tom Petty as musical influences for her band's debut EP. When asked about musical tastes, she said, "I love jazz! I love singing it. I also love country! My brother loves rock; he also has this chill Jason Mraz-like style. So basically, my answer is: jazz-country-rock-alternative? I have no idea! But I honestly would love to make country music."

Filmography

Film

Television

Discography

Singles

Promotional singles

Other appearances

Music videos

Production and songwriting credits

Awards and nominations

References

External links

 

1993 births
Living people
21st-century American actresses
21st-century Christians
Actors from Huntsville, Alabama
Actresses from Alabama
Actresses from Texas
American child actresses
American child singers
American Christians
American women singer-songwriters
American film actresses
American women pop singers
American stage actresses
American television actresses
Musicians from Huntsville, Alabama
Singer-songwriters from Texas
Walt Disney Records artists
21st-century American women singers
21st-century American singers
Singer-songwriters from Alabama